Emmanuelle Derly (born 30 April 1970) is a French former professional tennis player. In 1988, she was French Open girls’ doubles champion with Alexia Dechaume and was the runner-up in Wimbledon in the girls’ singles final, losing to Brenda Schultz 6–7(5), 1–6. Derly played for France in the 1985 Federation Cup. She also won the Clarins Open in 1988 with Alexia Dechaume.

WTA career finals

Doubles: 2 (1–1)

ITF finals

Singles (1-1)

Doubles (1-3)

References

External links
 
 
 

French female tennis players
1970 births
Living people
French Open junior champions
Grand Slam (tennis) champions in girls' doubles